The Turks and Caicos Islands National Football Team is the national team of the Turks and Caicos Islands and is controlled by the Turks and Caicos Islands Football Association.

History
Having formed a football association in 1996 and joined FIFA in 1998, Turks and Caicos Islands made its first appearance at an official FIFA competition when they entered the 2002 World Cup qualification. In March 2000, the team was knocked out in the first qualification round by St. Kitts and Nevis 14–0 on aggregate.

At the 2006 World Cup qualifying competition, the side suffered a 7–0 aggregate loss against Haiti in February 2004.

In 2007, the federation completed construction of their first stadium, the Turks and Caicos National Stadium, with the help of the FIFA Goal Programme, and have committed themselves to building a broad base of football participation and support.

On February 6, 2008, the team achieved its first World Cup qualification win 2–1 against Saint Lucia in the CONCACAF first round at home, but in the second leg played March 26, 2008, they were eliminated after they fell short having lost the away leg 0–2 in Saint Lucia for a 2–3 aggregate score.

The team went without a victory in an official game until June 3, 2014, when they beat the British Virgin Islands during the 2014 Caribbean Cup qualification, and as a result jumped from 207th to 181st in the FIFA rankings released during that month.

Coaches

 Gino Pacitto (1999–2000)
 Paul Crosbie (2003–2004)
 Charlie Cook (2006)
 Matthew Green (2008–2011)
 Gary Brough (2011–2014)
 Craig Harrington (2014–2015)
 Oliver Smith (2015–2018)
 Matt Barnes (2018–2019)
 Omar Edwards    (2019-2022)
 Vital Borkelmans (2022)
 Keith Jeffrey (2022-)

Results and fixtures

The following is a list of match results in the last 12 months, as well as any future matches that have been scheduled.

2022

2023

Current squad
 The following players were called up for the 2022–23 CONCACAF Nations League matches.
 Match dates: 3, 6, 11 and 14 June 2022
 Caps and goals correct as of:' 14 June 2022, after the match against 

|-----
! colspan="9" bgcolor="#B0D3FB" align="left" |
|----- bgcolor="#DFEDFD"
|-

|-----
! colspan="9" bgcolor="#B0D3FB" align="left" |
|----- bgcolor="#DFEDFD"
|-

|-----
! colspan="9" bgcolor="#B0D3FB" align="left" |
|----- bgcolor="#DFEDFD"
|-

Player recordsPlayers in bold are still active with Turks & Caicos Islands.''

Most capped players

Top goalscorers

Competitive record

World Cup record

CONCACAF Gold Cup record

Caribbean Cup record

CONCACAF Nations League record

Head-to-head record

References

External links
 Official website – Turks and Caicos Islands FA
 Földesi, László. Appearances and Goals for Turks and Caicos Islands at RSSSF.com
 "The Turks and Caicos Story" – Planet World Cup

 
Caribbean national association football teams